Legacy of Hopelessness is the second EP by Canadian grindcore band Fuck the Facts. The drums and bass were recorded on November 12, 2004 at June Music Studio in Ottawa, ON.  The remaining instruments and vocals were recorded in November and December 2004 at Fuck the Facts home studio (House of Fuck). The EP was mixed and mastered by Craig Boychuk at CB Audio in early 2005.

This was initially planned to be a solo release by Topon Das, however, it was migrated over to Fuck the Facts after the band realized that another full-length album was not feasible at that time. As such, the EP tends to show more overt electronic influences than previous releases.

In the UK, this EP was released without the enhanced tracks as an untitled split with Narcosis, Midget Parage and Archer on Privileged to Fail Records. A digital version of the EP was released in January 2011 and included a bonus track "Legacy of Hopelessness".

Track listing

Personnel
Topon Das – guitar, vocals, keyboards, MIDI, recording (except drums)
Dave Menard – guitar
Mel Mongeon – vocals
Marc-André Mongeon – bass
Tim Olsen – drums
Craig Boychuk – mixing, mastering
Stéphane Danis – recording (drums)

2005 EPs
Fuck the Facts albums